Stina Nilsson (born 24 June 1993) is a Swedish biathlete and former cross-country skier. She is a five-time Olympic medalist and the 2018 Olympic champion in the individual sprint. In March 2020 she announced that she would switch to competing in biathlon.

Career

2011–12: World Cup debut and Junior World Champion
Stina Nilsson finished 23rd in her World Cup debut in Drammen on 7 March 2012. Nilsson won the gold medal in the sprint event at the 2012 Junior World Championships in Erzurum, Turkey.

2012–13
At the 2013 Junior World Championships in Liberec, Czech Republic, Nilsson defended her gold medal in the sprint.

2013–14: First Olympic medal and World Cup podium
On 19 February 2014, Nilsson and Ida Ingemarsdotter, won bronze medals together in the team sprint at the Olympic Games in Sochi. Nilsson also finished 10th in the individual sprint. She made her first individual World Cup podium on 5 March, having finished third in the classical sprint in Drammen.

2014–15: Falun World Championships
Nilsson won three silver medals at the 2015 World Championships in Falun; On 19 February in the individual sprint, on 22 February in the team sprint (with Ida Ingemarsdotter), and on 26 February in the 4 × 5 km relay (with Sofia Bleckur, Charlotte Kalla, and Maria Rydqvist). Nilsson won the Under-23 World Cup title for the 2014–2015 season and finished fourth in the Sprint World Cup.

2015–16
She defended the U23 World Cup title in the 2015–2016 season and finished third in the Sprint World Cup, having won three individual sprint events over the season.

2016–17
On 2 March 2017, she won the silver medal in the 4 × 5 km relay (with Anna Haag, Charlotte Kalla, and Ebba Andersson) at the World Championships in Lahti. Nilsson won nine individual World Cup races over the 2016–2017 season, finishing fourth in the Overall World Cup and second in the Sprint World Cup. She also finished overall-third in the Tour de Ski.

2017–18: Four Olympic medals
Nilsson won four medals at the 2018 Olympic Games in Pyeongchang. On 13 February she became an Olympic champion, having won the gold medal in the individual sprint. On 17 and 21 February respectively, she won silver medals in the 4 × 5 km relay (with Anna Haag, Charlotte Kalla, and Ebba Andersson) and in the team sprint (with Charlotte Kalla). On 25 February, Nilsson won a surprise bronze in the 30 km classical mass start. She also finished 10th in the 15 km skiathlon. She finished second in the 2017–2018 Sprint World Cup, having won three individual sprint events over the season.

She was awarded the Victoria Scholarship in 2018.

2018-19: Continued World Championship success
Nilsson started the season off successfully, but injured her thigh in an extreme finish line stretch at the Otepää sprint event. She managed to recover just in time to return to competition at the 2019 World Championships in Seefeld, where she started her campaign with a silver medal in the freestyle sprint. She then went on to win her first World Championships gold medals in the classical team sprint and the 4 × 5 kilometre relay; in the latter, she anchored Sweden to the win by sprinting past Therese Johaug of Norway in the final uphill. Nilsson's success continued for the rest of the season and included a distance win at the World Cup finals in Quebec. She won the Sprint World Cup for the first time in her career.

2019-20: Injuries, switch to biathlon
Nilsson suffered a rib injury in the summer, but started the season with stable results, including 2nd places in the sprint and team sprint in Planica. At the first event of the Tour de Ski, however, the injury aggravated and she was forced to quit the Tour. She soon decided to end her season early after the recovery training proved to have been too heavy. The podiums in Planica turned out to be her last as a cross-country skier.

On 22 March, she officially announced the unexpected news that she was switching sports to biathlon on her Instagram account. She left cross-country skiing as one of Sweden's most decorated skiers of the 2010s.

2020-21: First steps in biathlon
For most of the 2020–21 season, Nilsson competed in the IBU Cup, where her season highlight was an 8th place in the pursuit at Brezno. A 2nd place in a relay held the same weekend marked Nilsson's first international biathlon podium. She also took part in the European Championships in January, placing 42nd in the sprint and 38th in the pursuit; struggles with shooting were consistently present during Nilsson's debut season.

In March 2021, Nilsson was selected to the Swedish team at their home World Cup competitions in Östersund, Sweden. She managed to perform well events, placing 26th in the sprint and 22nd in the pursuit, thus collecting her first world cup points already in her very first competitions in the Biathlon World Cup.

2021-22: First World Cup podiums in biathlon, Olympic roster
In the spring of 2021, Nilsson officially became part of Sweden's national biathlon team, having previously held a so-called "developmental" spot in the team. In the summer biathlon Swedish championships, she sensationally won gold over the Öberg sisters, Elvira and Hanna.

Nilsson's second season as a biathlete saw her secure a near-permanent spot at the starting line in World Cup competitions; she took part in almost all WC weekends. Managing to recover her skiing speed and improving her aim, she reached the top twenty in eight individual competitions. In January 2022, she celebrated her first World Cup podium, a second place at the relay in Ruhpolding, where she got to ski a leg at the absence of Sweden's biggest biathlon stars. In March, Nilsson reached her first individual podium in biathlon when she placed third in the sprint at Kontiolahti, Finland.

She was named as the last athlete into the Swedish biathlon team for the 2022 Beijing Olympics, her first as a biathlete. Due to the success of her more seasoned teammates, Nilsson did not get to start in any of the races, which prevented her from getting a first chance at winning an Olympic medal in both cross-country skiing and biathlon.

Cross-country skiing results
All results are sourced from the International Ski Federation (FIS).

Olympic Games
5 medals – (1 gold, 2 silver, 2 bronze)

World Championships
7 medals – (2 gold, 5 silver)

World Cup

Season titles
 3 titles – (2 U23, 1 Sprint)

Season standings

Individual podiums
23 victories – (12 , 11 )
41 podiums – (24 , 17 )

Team podiums
3 victories – (3 ) 
7 podiums – (1 , 6 )

Biathlon results
All results are sourced from the International Biathlon Union.

World Cup

Individual podiums
 0 victories 
 1 podiums

Team podiums
0 victories 
1 podiums  

*Results are from IBU races which include the Biathlon World Cup, Biathlon World Championships and the Winter Olympic Games.

References

External links

1993 births
Swedish female cross-country skiers
Swedish female biathletes
Cross-country skiers at the 2014 Winter Olympics
Cross-country skiers at the 2018 Winter Olympics
Olympic cross-country skiers of Sweden
Medalists at the 2014 Winter Olympics
Medalists at the 2018 Winter Olympics
Olympic medalists in cross-country skiing
Olympic gold medalists for Sweden
Olympic silver medalists for Sweden
Olympic bronze medalists for Sweden
FIS Nordic World Ski Championships medalists in cross-country skiing
Tour de Ski skiers
Living people
People from Malung-Sälen Municipality
21st-century Swedish women